The John Marek Independent Party (JMIP) was a political party in North Wales which eventually evolved into Forward Wales.

The JMIP was formed in March 2003 by John Marek. Marek had been deselected by his local Labour as official candidate in the 2003 National Assembly for Wales election, over his criticisms of its perceived rightward march.

The JMIP stood for the May 2003 elections to the National Assembly for Wales on a left-wing platform that included public ownership of the railways and greater powers for the Assembly. The media portrayed the JMIP as a real threat to Labour in North-East Wales.

The party stood in the constituencies of Wrexham and Clwyd South. The party also had a list in the North Wales region. Their candidates were:

John Marek (Wrexham, former Labour MP/AM)
Colin Jones (Second on the North Wales List, Anti-War Activist)
Marc Jones (Clwyd South, BBC Wales Director and Producer)

On 1 May 2003 Marek won Wrexham with 6,539 votes or 37.7% of the vote. Elsewhere they got 2,210 or 11.8% in Clwyd South and 11,008 or 6.3% on the North Wales list. It was the only minor party to retain its deposit in the regional lists and its constituency result compared favourably with other left-wing candidates.

During its existence the JMIP forged strong links with the Scottish Socialist Party, and Tommy Sheridan spoke at its Summer Gathering in August 2003. On 8 November 2003 the JMIP held a conference and re-launched itself as Forward Wales.

See also
Welsh Socialist Alliance

References

Defunct political parties in Wales
Political parties established in 2003
Political parties disestablished in 2003
Locally based political parties in Wales